The Lanzhou–Xinjiang high-speed railway, also known as Lanzhou–Xinjiang Passenger Railway or Lanxin Second Railway, is a high-speed railroad in Northwestern China from Lanzhou in Gansu Province to Ürümqi in the Xinjiang Uyghur Autonomous Region. It forms part of what China designates the Eurasia Continental Bridge corridor, a domestic high-speed railway corridor running from its city of Lianyungang in Jiangsu to the Kazakh border. The line is also shared with the conventional trains.

History
Construction work began on November 4, 2009. Track laying for the line was completed on November 16, 2013. Thirty-one stations will be built along the line. The project costs 143.5 billion yuan.

Unlike the existing Lanxin railway, which runs entirely in Gansu and Xinjiang, the new high-speed rail is routed from Lanzhou to Xining in Qinghai Province before heading northwest across the Qilian Mountains into the Hexi Corridor at Zhangye.

The first high-speed train traveled over this line on June 3, 2014. This was a test train with a media contingent with full revenue service not due to start until the end of 2014. The first segment of the line, the Ürümqi–Qumul part, was inaugurated on November 16, 2014. This high-speed railway segment is the first ever railway of that kind to exist in the Xinjiang autonomous region. The rest of the line opened on December 26, 2014. The  line cuts train travel time between the two cities from 20 hours to 12 hours. It also freed up capacity on the older Lanzhou–Xinjiang railway for freight transport.

On November 30, 2017, the Daheyan connection line between the Lanzhou–Xinjiang high-speed railway and the conventional Southern Xinjiang railway opened near Daheyan Town (near Turpan railway station). This will allow passenger trains traveling from Urumqi to destinations in Southern Xinjiang (such as Korla) to use the Ürümqi–Turpan section of the high-speed line before switching to the Southern Xinjiang Railway.

On 5 December 2021, Shandanmachang railway station opened along the railway.

Stations

Operational issues

Wind shed risk

Near Shanshan, the railway passes through the hundred-li wind zone, where desert wind constantly blows most days of a year. In 2007, strong wind overturned a train on the southern branch of Lanxin Railway, and four people were killed.

Engineering issues
Many sections of the line have experienced roadbed settlement, deformation, subsidence, frost heave, and cracking of the concrete of the track bed caused by saline soil, large temperature differences, and extremely low temperatures.

The -long Zhangjiazhuang Tunnel, located between Minhe South and Ledu South stations, was damaged several times during operation. The tunnel is embedded in mudstone, interbedded with sandstone and gypsum rock. The top covering soil layer is loess. In 2016, the tunnel was damaged twice, closing the line for 3 months. On December 24, 2018, the mountain above the tunnel deformed, but trains could initially continue operating. However, the next day, after further deformation, the tunnel was closed for thorough inspection. Due to repair works, the line was closed between Lanzhou and Xining until October 11, 2020. Trains were routed over the lower speed Lanzhou–Qinghai railway.

Earthquake damage 
As a result of the January 2022 Menyuan earthquake, some bridges and tunnels on the line sustained serious damage.

Landslide 
In September 2022, traffic on the line was suspended just north of Xining after a landslide caused the deck of a viaduct to shift.

Economics
An analysis of China's railway network published in 2021 showed that the Lanzhou–Xinjiang high-speed railway has the lowest utilization rate among all high-speed railways in the country, carrying, on average, merely 2.3 million passenger kilometers of service per kilometer of the mainline. In comparison, the average load over China's high-speed rail network is 17 million passenger-km per km, and the nation's highest-volume line, the Beijing–Shanghai one, carries 48 million passenger-km per km. According to the same analysis, a high-speed line would need to carry ca. 36 million passenger-km per km to fully pay its own operating costs. While the Lanzhou-Xinjiang line has the capacity to carry over 160 pairs of high-speed trains per day, it currently only carries 4.

As a result of the Belt and Road Initiative, freight transport along the Eurasian Land Bridge corridor increased and the conventional speed Lanzhou–Xinjiang railway sometimes hits capacity limitations, which has led some freight traffic to be shifted to the underutilized high-speed line.

References 

High-speed railway lines in China
Rail transport in Gansu
Rail transport in Qinghai
Rail transport in Xinjiang
Standard gauge railways in China